Tewan Liptapallop (born 29 December 1959) is a Thai politician. He served from 10 July 2019 to 20 July 2020 as Prime Minister's Office Minister in the second cabinet of Prime Minister Prayut Chan-o-cha.

Early life and education 
Tewan Liptapanlop was born on December 29, 1959. He was the younger brother of Suwat Liptapanlop. Tewan graduation Bachelor of Laws from Chulalongkorn University.

Political careers 
Tewan entered politics by being elected a member of the House of Representatives for the first time in March 1992 under the Justice Unity Party and has been elected for a total of 3 times. In 2007, he was disqualified from politics for five years for serving as a member of the executive committee of the Thai Rak Thai Party. In 2018, Tewan was elected as the leader of the Chart Pattana Party.

Royal decorations 
 2005 -  Knight Grand Cordon (Special Class) of The Most Noble Order of the Crown of Thailand
 2020 -  Knight Grand Cordon (Special Class) of the Most Exalted Order of the White Elephant

References 

Living people
1959 births
Tewan Liptapallop
Tewan Liptapallop
Tewan Liptapallop
Tewan Liptapallop
Tewan Liptapallop
Tewan Liptapallop
Tewan Liptapallop